Gustavo Salcedo (born 21 January 1982) is a Peruvian rower. He competed in the men's single sculls event at the 2004 Summer Olympics.

References

External links
 

1982 births
Living people
Peruvian male rowers
Olympic rowers of Peru
Rowers at the 2004 Summer Olympics
Sportspeople from Callao